Christopher Allan Boyko (born October 10, 1954) is a senior United States district judge of the United States District Court for the Northern District of Ohio.

Education and career

Born in Cleveland, Ohio, Boyko is a second-generation Ukrainian American. He received a Bachelor of Arts degree from Mount Union College in 1976 and a Juris Doctor from the Cleveland State University College of Law in 1979. He was in private practice in Parma, Ohio, from 1979 to 1993, also working for the City of Parma as an assistant prosecutor from 1981 to 1987, and as a prosecutor and city Director of Law from 1987 to 1993. He was a judge of the Cuyahoga County Court of Common Pleas from 1996 to 2004.

Federal judicial service

On July 22, 2004, Boyko was nominated by President George W. Bush to a seat on the United States District Court for the Northern District of Ohio vacated by Paul Ramon Matia. Boyko was confirmed by the United States Senate on November 21, 2004, and received his commission on January 3, 2005. He assumed senior status on January 6, 2020.

References

External links

1954 births
Living people
University of Mount Union alumni
Cleveland–Marshall College of Law alumni
Ohio state court judges
Judges of the United States District Court for the Northern District of Ohio
United States district court judges appointed by George W. Bush
21st-century American judges
Lawyers from Cleveland
American people of Ukrainian descent
People from Cleveland